Hohen Neuendorf is a town in the Oberhavel district, in Brandenburg, Germany. It is located north west of Berlin.

Geography
Hohen Neuendorf is situated upon the Havel river (built on the Oder-Havel Canal) and is bordered by the Berlin areas Frohnau and Heiligensee to the south, Mühlenbecker Land to the east, Birkenwerder and Oranienburg to the north, and Hennigsdorf and Velten to the west.

Division of the town
Hohen Neuendorf consists of 4 districts (with area codes):
 Hohen Neuendorf and its districts Elseneck and Niederheide (area code: 16540)
 Stolpe (area code: 16540)
 Borgsdorf and its districts (Wohnplätze) Pinnow, Weißes Haus and Havelhausen (area code: 16556)
 Bergfelde (area code: 16562)

Demography

History

Since the suburban move of Berlin which ended in the late 19th century, allowed by the development of the railway, Hohen Neuendorf was a small town with few residents.

The creation of a train station in Hohen Neuendorf on the North Train from Berlin in the last quarter of the 19th century, thanks to the larger, richer nearby village of Stolpe, led to a quick development of Hohen Neuendorf paralleled to that occurring in Berlin.
With the rising role of Hohen Neuendorf as a commuter village across from Stolpe (which stayed largely agricultural in nature), it was finally with the (mis)placement of the train stop that emphasis on the settlement of Hohen Neuendorf ensued.
The new Hohen Neuendorf station today is frequented by the users of Berlin's S-Bahn (rapid railway), while the old station's building has now been changed into a hotel.

West Berlin border crossing
The municipality shared its borders with the former West Berlin, and so during 1961-1990 it was separated from it by the Berlin Wall. Between 1 January 1988 and 30 June 1990 Hohen Neuendorf's component village of Stolpe served as East German border crossing for cars travelling between West Berlin and the East German Democratic Republic) or the West German Federal Republic of Germany. The traffic was subject to the Interzonal traffic regulations, which followed the special regulations of the Transit Agreement (1972) for traffic between West Germany and West Berlin.

Twin towns – sister cities

Hohen Neuendorf is twinned with:
 Bergerac, France
 Fürstenau, Germany
 Janów Podlaski, Poland
 Müllheim, Germany

From 1992 to 2017 Hohen Neuendorf was twinned with Maing, France.

Sport
The RU Hohen Neuendorf, a rugby union club, competes at the second tier of German club rugby, the 2nd Rugby-Bundesliga North/East, having earned promotion to the league in 2008.

References

External links
 

Localities in Oberhavel
Berlin border crossings